Ahja River Valley Landscape Conservation Area is a nature park situated in Põlva County, Estonia.

Its area is 11150 ha.

The protected area was designated in 1957 to protect the central course of Ahja River and its surrounding areas. In 2014, the protected area was redesigned to the landscape conservation area.

References

Nature reserves in Estonia
Geography of Põlva County